1965–66 was the fifty-third occasion on which the Lancashire Cup completion had been held.

Warrington won the trophy by beating Rochdale Hornets by the score of 16-5

The match was played at Knowsley Road, Eccleston, St Helens, Merseyside, (historically in the county of Lancashire). The attendance was 21,360 and receipts were £3,800

It would be almost another 20 years before the attendance would again exceed 20,000<br/ >

Background 

The total number of teams entering the competition remained the same at 14.

The same fixture format was retained, and due to the number of clubs this resulted in no bye but one “blank” or “dummy” fixture in the first round, and one bye in the second round

Competition and results

Round 1 
Involved 7 matches (with no bye but one “blank” fixture) and 14 clubs

Round 2 - Quarter-finals 
Involved 3 matches (with one bye) and 7 clubs

Round 3 – Semi-finals 
Involved 2 matches and 4 clubs

Final

Teams and scorers 

Scoring - Try = three (3) points - Goal = two (2) points - Drop goal = two (2) points

The road to success

Notes and comments 
1 * Knowsley Road was the home ground of St. Helens from 1890 to 2010. The final capacity was in the region of 18,000, although the actual record attendance was 35,695, set on 26 December 1949, for a league game between St Helens and Wigan

See also 
1965–66 Northern Rugby Football League season
Rugby league county cups

References

External links
Saints Heritage Society
1896–97 Northern Rugby Football Union season at wigan.rlfans.com
Hull&Proud Fixtures & Results 1896/1897
Widnes Vikings - One team, one passion Season In Review - 1896-97
The Northern Union at warringtonwolves.org

1965 in English rugby league
RFL Lancashire Cup